The Millcreek Mall or Millcreek Mall Complex is a one-level shopping center  southwest of downtown Erie, Pennsylvania, between Peach Street and Interstate 79, in Millcreek Township. The mall is the fourteenth largest shopping mall in the United States, and, with 195 stores, Millcreek Mall is currently the third largest shopping mall in Pennsylvania.

The complex opened on November 9, 1975 and was developed by the Youngstown, Ohio-based Cafaro Company, who continue to own and operate it. Due to Pennsylvania's lack of sales tax on clothing, the Millcreek Mall attracts many visitors from Ohio, New York and Canada. The mall proper houses 121 store spaces, with 12 kiosks. The 165 stores and restaurants figure often cited includes stores within the physical mall and its many peripheral restaurants, stores and strip plazas. The mall is anchored by Boscov's, JCPenney, and Macy's.

History

The mall's original anchor stores included Boston Store, Halle's, JCPenney, Kaufmann's, Carlisle's and Sears. Boston Store in 1979 became Horne's, which in turn closed and became Lazarus in 1994. Lazarus closed this anchor in 1997. Halle's later became a Dahlkemper's catalog showroom, which closed in 1993. Its space became Burlington Coat Factory. HomePlace took the former Carlisle's location after Carlisle's closure in 1995. Elder-Beerman took over the former Lazarus in 1998, but was converted five years later to The Bon-Ton. After HomePlace closed, its space was divided between Steve & Barry's and AC Moore, the former of which closed in 2009. Also, Kaufmann's was converted to Macy's in September 2006. Burlington Coat Factory moved out of the mall in late 2012. In 2014, the space that was occupied by Burlington was split into six spaces that now house Primanti Brothers, a Mad Mex restaurant, a Round One Entertainment arcade and a Guitar Center. The two other spaces are still vacant as of now with no future plans. The area of the mall was also renamed "The Promenade" and it also has its own mall entrance as well.

The combination of anchors has given it the shape of a gun pointed at downtown Erie when viewed from above, which has led to controversy in some cases. This has resulted in an urban legend which states the mall was intentionally built that way under the direction of the mafia.

On March 27, 2008, it was announced the mall would receive a multimillion-dollar renovation. Among the new additions to the mall are a children's area, a food court, and renovated entrances to the building. The mall also got skylights, porcelain floors, a new west side entrance, and new parking lot lights. The food court opened in late 2008.

Boscov's opened in the recently shuttered Sears on October 5, 2017.

On October 18, 2017, it was announced Round One Entertainment will join the center. It opened in Summer 2018.

On January 31, 2018, it was announced that regional division The Bon-Ton will be closing this location.

On September 18, 2022, a massive fight broke out between juveniles in the Macy's wing in the Food Court which resulted in a shot being fired into the ceiling and the mall having to go into lockdown. The individuals involved in the shooting were charged and the Millcreek Mall is currently working on to find a way to prevent this sort of crime from happening again.

In February 2023, it was announced that Dick's Sporting Goods will be moving into the space formerly occupied by The Bon-Ton.

Outside the Millcreek Mall
The Millcreek Mall Pavilion consists of stores including Ross Dress for Less, HomeGoods, Michaels Arts & Crafts, Christmas Tree Shops, Five Below, Carter's, Ulta Beauty, Vertical Jump Park, DSW Shoe Warehouse, and Dick's Sporting Goods.

The mall property is also home to several restaurants including Max & Erma's, Smokey Bones Barbeque and Grill, Outback Steakhouse, Red Lobster, Starbucks, Picasso's Deli, Cold Stone Creamery, Arby's and Aoyama Japanese Steakhouse, which is in a former Chi-Chi's.

A Homewood Suites, TownePlace Suites and a Fairfield Inn also sit on the property. The former Blair store, originally a Children's Palace toy store, has been converted into the Erie Institute of Technology (EIT). The Hills / Ames department store, which sat empty for over five years, became All Seasons Market Place & Flea Market but now houses At Home, a home decor store. Also on the property is the former Cinema 6, a discount movie theater, which is now the Elevate! church.

A Men's Wearhouse, OfficeMax, David's Bridal, Ollie's Bargain Outlet, and many smaller stores also occupy land on the site of the Millcreek Mall.

On July 3, 2019, Sonic Drive-In opened up in the former Sears Auto Center lot.

Millcreek Marketplace
Across the street from the Millcreek Mall, the land that was once woods has begun to experience a major change. On the land there are five restaurants; O'Charley's, Moe's Southwest Grill, Buffalo Wild Wings, Cheddar's Scratch Kitchen, and McDonald's, a SpringHill Suites hotel, PNC Bank, and a Verizon Wireless store.

Giant Eagle opened a supermarket on the property on March 23, 2017.

In popular media
On the popular children's television series Arthur, the mall in Elwood City is based on Millcreek Mall, stylized as Mill Creek Mall.

See also
 Peach Street
 List of largest shopping malls in the United States

References

External links
 Millcreek Mall

Shopping malls in Pennsylvania
Buildings and structures in Erie County, Pennsylvania
Cafaro Company
Shopping malls established in 1975
Tourist attractions in Erie County, Pennsylvania